The Veterans Crisis Line is a United States-based crisis hotline for military veterans, service members, their families, and caregivers. The service is available 24/7 via the toll-free hotline number 988. Callers press 1 on their keypad to connect to the Veterans Crisis Line instead of the 988 Suicide & Crisis Lifeline, which shares the same number. It can also be reached by texting the SMS number 838255 or via online chat on the hotline's website.

History 
The Veterans Crisis Line (VCL) was established in 2007 as the National Veterans Suicide Prevention Hotline following the passage of the Joshua Omvig Veterans Suicide Prevention Act. It was renamed in 2011 to its current name. It is administered by the U.S. Department of Veterans Affairs in partnership with the Substance Abuse and Mental Health Services Administration. Since the VCL's establishment, it has taken over 6.4 million calls, 269,000 texts, and 772,000 online chats.

After the Fall of Kabul in 2021, the VCL reported an significant increase in calls that numbered in the thousands.

After the rollout of the shorter 988 phone number, an overall increase of calls to the VCL was reported.

Impact on callers 
In a 2021 study, a majority of veterans interviewed after their usage of the hotline reported that they felt it was helpful and kept them safe. Internal VA statistics from 2022 showed that veterans who contacted the VCL were 10 times more likely to have contact with VA mental healthcare after calling than before their call.

See also 

 Crisis hotline
 List of suicide crisis lines

References 

Emergency telephone numbers

Suicide prevention
Crisis hotlines